I Have Landed (2002) is the 10th and final volume of collected essays by the Harvard paleontologist Stephen Jay Gould. The essays were culled from his monthly column "This View of Life" in Natural History magazine, to which Gould contributed for 27 years. The book deals, in typically discursive fashion, with themes familiar to Gould's writing: evolution and its teaching, science biography, probabilities and common sense.

The series of consecutive essays began in 1974, ending in January 2001 with the title essay "I have landed." The title refers to the very first words his grandfather Papa Joe wrote as he arrived on Ellis Island, New York as a newly arrived Hungarian immigrant, September 11, 1901.

Reviews
A Grand Finale - by Robin McKie, The Observer. 
Review of I Have Landed
Book review - by Jim Walker

2002 non-fiction books
American essay collections
Books by Stephen Jay Gould
English-language books
Works originally published in Natural History (magazine)
W. W. Norton & Company books